The Kumbharli Ghat is a mountain pass in Maharashtra, India that connects the coastal Ratnagiri District in Konkan  region of Maharashtra with the Satara District in Desh region. It cuts across the Western Ghats range. It is one of few link roads between the Konkan and Ghatmaatha in Maharashtra. It links the cities of Chiplun (Ratnagiri district) and Karad (Satara district). Near the eastern end is the Koyna Dam.

Location 
This ghat is on the Karad-Chiplun state highway.  Also, this highway joins to the NH-4 near Karad. Malharpeth, Koyananagar, Patan and Karad are the major cities on this road.

Mountain passes of Maharashtra
Mountain passes of the Western Ghats